Golubie Wężewskie  (Gollubien; from 1934-45 Friedberg) is a village in the administrative district of Gmina Kowale Oleckie, within Olecko County, Warmian-Masurian Voivodeship in northern Poland. 

References

Villages in Olecko County